Loon Lake is a lake in Cass County, Minnesota, in the United States.

Loon Lake was named after the loon, a water bird native to the area.

See also
List of lakes in Minnesota

References

Lakes of Minnesota
Lakes of Cass County, Minnesota